Frank Lawrence Rosenthal (June 12, 1929 – October 13, 2008), also known as "Lefty" Rosenthal, was an American professional sports bettor, former Las Vegas casino executive, and organized crime associate. Rosenthal, who was once called "the greatest living expert on sports gambling" by Sports Illustrated, is credited with bringing increased exposure to sports betting to Las Vegas in the 1970s.

Rosenthal's life and career in Las Vegas served as the basis of Martin Scorsese's 1995 film Casino, where he was portrayed by Robert De Niro and re-named Sam "Ace" Rothstein.

Early years

Illinois
Frank Rosenthal was born in Chicago, Illinois, in a Jewish family and grew up in the city's West Side. As a youth, he learned sports betting in the bleachers of Wrigley Field and would often skip classes to attend Chicago sporting events. Rosenthal's father also owned racehorses, whereby he became familiar with betting odds and percentages at a young age.

By the mid-1950s, Rosenthal was working with the Chicago Outfit. Chosen for his expert odds-making ability, he ran the biggest illegal bookmaking office in the United States on behalf of the Mafia—specifically, the Outfit. Based in Cicero, Illinois, under the guise of a home improvement company, Rosenthal and the Outfit bought "contracts" to fix sporting events. After being indicted as a conspirator on multiple sports bribery charges, Rosenthal moved the operation to North Bay Village in Miami, Florida, to avoid attention.

Miami
By 1961, Rosenthal had acquired a national reputation as a sports bettor, oddsmaker, and handicapper, and in Miami he was frequently seen in the company of prominent Outfit members Jackie Cerone and Fiore Buccieri. At this time Rosenthal was issued with a subpoena to appear before U.S. Senator John McClellan's subcommittee on Gambling and Organized Crime, accused of match-fixing. He invoked the Fifth Amendment 37 times and was never charged. Due to this, Rosenthal was barred from racing establishments in Florida.

Despite his frequent arrests for illegal gambling and bookmaking, Rosenthal was convicted only once, after pleading no contest in 1963 to allegedly bribing a New York University player to shave points for a college basketball game in North Carolina. He was also a suspect in multiple business and car bombings in the greater Miami area during the 1960s. It was at this time the Federal Bureau of Investigation (FBI) opened an ongoing case file on Rosenthal which amassed 300 pages. In order to once again escape police attention, Rosenthal moved to Las Vegas, Nevada, in 1968.

Las Vegas career
A big promoter of sports gambling, Rosenthal secretly ran the Stardust, Fremont, Marina, and Hacienda casinos when they were controlled by the Chicago Outfit. He also created the first sports book that operated from within a casino, making the Stardust one of the world's leading centers for sports gambling. Another Rosenthal innovation was hiring more female blackjack dealers, which in one year helped double the Stardust's income.

In 1976, the FBI and Las Vegas Metropolitan Police Department (LVMPD) discovered that Rosenthal was secretly running four large casinos without obtaining a state gaming license, holding a hearing to determine his legal ability to obtain a license. The hearing was headed by Nevada Gaming Control Board Chairman (future U.S. Senator) Harry Reid. Rosenthal was denied a license because of his arrest record and his documented reputation as an organized crime associate, particularly because of his boyhood friendship with Chicago mob enforcer Anthony Spilotro.

Rosenthal married Geri McGee on May 4, 1969. McGee already had a daughter, Robin L. Marmor, from a previous marriage with ex-husband Lenny Marmor. Rosenthal and McGee later had two children together, Steven and Stephanie. There were infidelities on both sides, with McGee secretly having an affair with Spilotro. The marriage ended in divorce in 1981, with Rosenthal attributing the failure primarily to McGee's inability to escape her dependence on alcohol and drugs. After leaving Rosenthal and stealing a portion of his savings, McGee died at a motel in Los Angeles on November 9, 1982, at age 46, of an apparent drug overdose. Her death was ruled accidental, from a combination of Valium, cocaine and alcohol.

Later years and death
On October 4, 1982, Rosenthal survived an assassination attempt in Las Vegas, in which a bomb attached to the gasoline tank was detonated when he started his car. While Rosenthal had dined at the Tony Roma's restaurant at 620 E. Sahara Avenue, a person or persons unknown placed the bomb in his car. Rosenthal likely survived because of a manufacturing device unique to his particular model car (a 1981 Cadillac Eldorado): a stout metal plate under the driver's seat, installed by General Motors on all El Dorado models to correct a balancing problem. This plate shielded Rosenthal's body from most of the explosion's force. Although no one was ever charged for this murder attempt, Milwaukee mob boss Frank Balistrieri was possibly responsible. Balistrieri, who was known as the "Mad Bomber" to law enforcement, was heard (via wiretap) blaming Rosenthal for the legal problems the mob-controlled casinos were suffering. Similarly, just weeks before the bombing, Balistrieri told his sons he intended to get "full satisfaction" for Rosenthal's perceived wrongdoing. Other likely suspects include Kansas City mob bosses, who were recorded on an FBI wiretap tape calling Rosenthal "crazy"; Spilotro, either acting with others or on behalf of the Outfit; and outlaw bikers who were friends of Rosenthal's ex-wife, Geri McGee.

Rosenthal left Las Vegas about six months later, and moved to Laguna Niguel, California. He focused on raising his children, who were both accomplished youth swimmers. Rosenthal was later formally banned from Las Vegas casinos in 1987, when he was placed in "the Black Book", making him persona non grata—unable to work in, or even enter, any Nevada casino because of his alleged ties to organized crime. However, in June 1990, Rosenthal won an unprecedented court ruling to have his name removed. Rosenthal was represented in the hearing by future Las Vegas Mayor Oscar Goodman. Goodman and Rosenthal lost, however, in the Nevada Supreme Court in 1991, and Rosenthal's ban was reinstated.

Rosenthal later moved from Laguna Niguel to Boca Raton, Florida, where he ran a sports bar called "Croc's", and finally to Miami Beach, where he ran a sports betting website and worked as a consultant for several offshore sports betting companies.

Rosenthal died on October 13, 2008, at the age of 79, of an apparent heart attack. After his death, it was disclosed by Las Vegas Review-Journal reporter Jane Ann Morrison that Rosenthal had been a top echelon informant for the FBI, and his wife Geri was also an FBI informant.

In popular culture
The film Casino (1995), directed by Martin Scorsese with a screenplay co-written by Nicholas Pileggi from his biography Casino: Love and Honor in Las Vegas, is largely based on Rosenthal's time in Las Vegas. The film takes some creative license with the facts and timeline, but is broadly accurate to Rosenthal's story and his relationship with Anthony Spilotro, on which the character Nicky Santoro (played by Joe Pesci) is based. Rosenthal is represented by the character Sam "Ace" Rothstein (played by Robert De Niro). The character of Ginger McKenna Rothstein, his wife in the film (played by Sharon Stone), is based on Geri McGee, Rosenthal's wife in real life.

In an interview about the movie, Rosenthal stated that his character portrayed by Robert De Niro was quite but not fully similar to him, namely "7 on a scale of 1 to 10", and when asked about Stone’s portrayal of his wife, he stated, “I really wouldn't want to get into that area. It's an area that is distasteful and brings back bad memories. I wouldn't be willing to dispute what you just said, but I certainly wouldn't confirm it.”

References

External links
 
 
 
 

1929 births
2008 deaths
20th-century American businesspeople
21st-century American businesspeople
20th-century American Jews
21st-century American Jews
American casino industry businesspeople
American columnists
American gamblers
American television talk show hosts
Bookmakers
Businesspeople from California
Businesspeople from Chicago
Car bomb victims
Chicago Outfit mobsters
Federal Bureau of Investigation informants
Jewish American gangsters
Organized crime memoirists
People from Laguna Niguel, California